The 2017 SaskTel Tankard, the provincial men's curling championship for Saskatchewan, was held from February 1 to 5 at the Tisdale RecPlex in Tisdale, Saskatchewan. The winning Adam Casey team represented Saskatchewan at the 2017 Tim Hortons Brier in St. John's, Newfoundland and Labrador.

Teams
The teams are listed as follows:

Knockout Draw Brackets

A Event

B Event

C Event

Playoffs

1 vs 2

3 vs 4

Semifinal

Final

References

External links
Coverage on CurlingZone

2017 Tim Hortons Brier
Curling in Saskatchewan
2017 in Saskatchewan
February 2017 sports events in Canada